Countess Wilhelmine Christine of Nassau-Siegen (1629 – 22 January 1700), official titles: Gräfin zu Nassau, Katzenelnbogen, Vianden und Diez, Frau zu Beilstein, was a countess from the House of Nassau-Siegen, a cadet branch of the Ottonian Line of the House of Nassau, and through marriage Countess of .

Biography
Wilhelmine Christine was born in 1629 as the youngest daughter of Count William of Nassau-Siegen and Countess Christiane of Erbach. The exact date and place of birth of Wilhelmine Christine are unknown; she was baptised on 10 June 1629 in Heusden, the city of which her father had been governor since 1626.

Count William Frederick of Nassau-Diez, the stadtholder of Friesland, noted in June 1645 in his diary that the sixteen-year-old Wilhelmine Christine was the favourite girlfriend of Prince William II of Orange, ‘die hij zoo dicwils custe als hij woude, alleen sijnde, en de borstjes tastede’ (‘whom he kissed as much as he wished, being alone, and touching the breasts’). William II had to promise Wilhelmine Christine ‘sich deechlijck te hauden’ (‘to stay decent’), but the consequence of this intimacy was that her mother Christiane did not want Wilhelmine Christine to be alone with Prince William, ‘doch dat sie het allebeide sochten’ (‘but that they both sought it’). When Christiane came in ‘maeckte prins Wilhelm den slaepert’ (‘Prince William sneaked out’).

Also after the death of Christiane in 1646, the prince was still in contact with Wilhelmine Christine. In November 1648, William Frederick wrote in his diary that William had told him that he had secretly visited her dozens of times and had seen her in bed twice, but that he had stayed ‘degelijck’ (‘decent’), ‘niet als kussen en eens geraeckt, doch en passant en op het lest’ (‘nothing but kissing and touching, but in passing and at the last moment’). Earlier, William had mentioned that he would have wanted Wilhelmine Christine ‘heel’ (‘complete’); he would have preferred her as wife to anyone else.

Wilhelmine Christine married at Arolsen Castle on 26 January 1660 to Count Josias II of Waldeck-Wildungen (Wildungen, 31 July 1636Jul. – Kandia, 8 August 1669Greg.), the second son of Count Philip VII of Waldeck-Wildungen and Countess Anne Catherine of Sayn-Wittgenstein.

Wilhelmine Christine and Josias were closely related. Elisabeth of Nassau-Siegen, Josias’ grandmother, was the eldest sister of Wilhelmine Christine’s father. Also from his mother’s side, Josias was related to Wilhelmine Christine. His great-grandmother, also named Elisabeth of Nassau-Siegen, was a younger sister of Count John VI ‘the Elder’ of Nassau-Siegen, the great-grandfather of Wilhelmine Christine. Agnes of Wied, the great-great-grandmother of Josias, was a daughter of yet another Elisabeth of Nassau-Siegen, a younger sister of Count William I ‘the Rich’ of Nassau-Siegen, who was also the great-great-grandfather of Wilhelmine Christine. Finally, both Wilhelmine Christine and Josias descended from Count Wolrad I of Waldeck-Waldeck, Wilhelmine Christine through her grandmother Magdalene of Waldeck-Wildungen.

Wilhelmine Christine outlived her husband by almost 31 years; she died in Hildburghausen on 22 January 1700 and was buried in Saalfeld on 27 January.

Issue

From the marriage of Wilhelmine Christine and Josias, the following children were born:
 Eleonore Louise (Arolsen Castle, 9 July 1661 – Arolsen Castle, 25 August 1661).
 William Philip (Arolsen Castle, 27 September 1662 – Arolsen Castle, 29 December 1662).
 Charlotte Dorothy (Arolsen Castle, 9 October 1663 – Arolsen Castle, 10 December 1664).
 Charlotte Joanne (Arolsen Castle, 13 December 1664 – Hildburghausen, 1 February 1699), married in Maastricht on 2 December 1690 to Duke John Ernest of Saxe-Saalfeld (Gotha, 22 augustus 1658 – Saalfeld, 17 December 1729).
 Sophie Wilhelmine (Arolsen Castle, 24 September 1666 – 13 February 1668).
 Maximilian Frederick (Arolsen Castle, 25 April 1668 – Arolsen Castle, September 1668).
 William Gustavus (Arolsen Castle, 25 April 1668 – Arolsen Castle, 21 May 1669).

Known descendants
Wilhelmine Christine has several known descendants. Among them are:
 the monarchs Victoria, Edward VII, George V, Edward VIII, George VI, Elizabeth II and Charles III of the United Kingdom,
 the kings Leopold I, Leopold II, Albert I, Leopold III, Baudouin I, Albert II and Philippe I of the Belgians.
 the tsars Ferdinand I, Boris III and Simeon II of Bulgaria.
 the kings Ferdinand II, Pedro V, Luís I, Carlos I and Manuel II of Portugal,
 Grand Duke Henri I of Luxembourg.

Ancestors

Notes

References

Sources
 
 
 
 
 
 
 
 
 
 
 
 
 
 
 
 
  (1882). Het vorstenhuis Oranje-Nassau. Van de vroegste tijden tot heden (in Dutch). Leiden: A.W. Sijthoff/Utrecht: J.L. Beijers.

External links

 Nassau. In: Medieval Lands. A prosopography of medieval European noble and royal families, compiled by Charles Cawley.
 Nassau Part 5. In: An Online Gotha, by Paul Theroff.
 Waldeck. In: An Online Gotha, by Paul Theroff.

|-

1629 births
1700 deaths
Wilhelmine Christine of Nassau-Siegen
German Calvinist and Reformed Christians
Wilhelmine Christine of Nassau-Siegen
∞|Wilhelmine Christine of Nassau-Siegen
17th-century German women